Sibilants are fricative consonants of higher amplitude and pitch, made by directing a stream of air with the tongue towards the teeth. Examples of sibilants are the consonants at the beginning of the English words sip, zip, ship, and genre. The symbols in the International Phonetic Alphabet used to denote the sibilant sounds in these words are, respectively, . Sibilants have a characteristically intense sound, which accounts for their paralinguistic use in getting one's attention (e.g. calling someone using "psst!" or quieting someone using "shhhh!").

A broader category is stridents, which include more fricatives than sibilants such as uvulars. Because all sibilants are also stridents, the terms are sometimes used interchangeably. However, the terms do not mean the same thing. Sibilants are a higher pitched subset of the stridents.

"Stridency" refers to the perceptual intensity of the sound of a sibilant consonant, or obstacle fricatives or affricates, which refers to the critical role of the teeth in producing the sound as an obstacle to the airstream. Non-sibilant fricatives and affricates produce their characteristic sound directly with the tongue or lips etc. and the place of contact in the mouth, without secondary involvement of the teeth.

The characteristic intensity of sibilants means that small variations in tongue shape and position are perceivable, with the result that there are many sibilant types that contrast in various languages.

Acoustics 
Sibilants are louder than their non-sibilant counterparts, and most of their acoustic energy occurs at higher frequencies than non-sibilant fricatives—usually around 8,000 Hz.

Sibilant types 
All sibilants are coronal consonants (made with the tip or front part of the tongue). However, there is a great deal of variety among sibilants as to tongue shape, point of contact on the tongue, and point of contact on the upper side of the mouth.

The following variables affect sibilant sound quality, and, along with their possible values, are ordered from sharpest (highest-pitched) to dullest (lowest-pitched):
 Tongue shape: , alveolo-palatal, palato-alveolar, retroflex
 Place of articulation (point of contact on the upper side of the mouth):  or denti-alveolar, postalveolar, 
 Point of contact on the tongue:  "closed" (see below),  non-"closed", 

Generally, the values of the different variables co-occur so as to produce an overall sharper or duller sound. For example, a laminal denti-alveolar grooved sibilant occurs in Polish, and a subapical palatal retroflex sibilant occurs in Toda.

Tongue shape 
The main distinction is the shape of the tongue. Most sibilants have a groove running down the centerline of the tongue that helps focus the airstream, but it is not known how widespread this is. In addition, the following tongue shapes are described, from sharpest and highest-pitched to dullest and lowest-pitched:

 Hollow (e.g. ): This hollow accepts a large volume of air that is forced through a typically narrow aperture that directs a high-velocity jet of air against the teeth, which results in a high-pitched, piercing "hissing" sound. Because of the prominence of these sounds, they are the most common and most stable of sibilants cross-linguistically. They occur in English, where they are denoted with a letter s or z, as in soon or zone.
 Alveolo-palatal (e.g. ): with a convex, V-shaped tongue, and highly palatalized (middle of the tongue strongly raised or bowed).
 Palato-alveolar (e.g. ): with a "domed" tongue (convex and moderately palatalized).  These sounds occur in English, where they are denoted with letter combinations such as sh, ch, g, j or si, as in shin, chin, gin and vision.
 Retroflex (e.g. ): with a flat or concave tongue, and no palatalization. There is a variety of these sounds, some of which also go by other names (e.g. "flat postalveolar" or "apico-alveolar"). The  or "true" retroflex sounds are the very dullest and lowest-pitched of all the sibilants.

The latter three post-alveolar types of sounds are often known as "hushing" sounds because of their quality, as opposed to the "hissing" alveolar sounds. The alveolar sounds in fact occur in several varieties, in addition to the normal sound of English s:
 Palatalized: Sibilants can occur with or without raising the tongue body to the palate (palatalization). Palatalized alveolars are transcribed e.g.  and occur in Russian; they sound similar to the cluster  occurring in the middle of the English phrase miss you.
 Lisping: Alveolar sibilants made with the tip of the tongue near the upper teeth have a softer sound reminiscent of (but still sharper-sounding than) the "lisping"  sound of English think. These sounds are relatively uncommon, but occur in some of the indigenous languages of California as well as in the Spanish dialects of western and southern Andalucía (southwest Spain), mostly in the provinces of Cádiz, Málaga, Sevilla and Huelva.

Place of articulation 
Sibilants can be made at any  articulation, i.e. the tongue can contact the upper side of the mouth anywhere from the upper teeth to the hard palate, with the in-between articulations being denti-alveolar,  and postalveolar.

Point of contact on the tongue 
The tongue can contact the upper side of the mouth with the very tip of the tongue (an  articulation, e.g. ); with the surface just behind the tip, called the blade of the tongue (a  articulation, e.g. ); or with the underside of the tip (a  articulation). Apical and subapical articulations are always tongue-up, with the tip of the tongue above the teeth, while laminal articulations can be either tongue-up or tongue-down, with the tip of the tongue behind the lower teeth. This distinction is particularly important for retroflex sibilants, because all three varieties can occur, with noticeably different sound qualities.  For more information on these variants and their relation to sibilants, see the article on postalveolar consonants.

For tongue-down laminal articulations, an additional distinction can be made depending on where exactly behind the lower teeth the tongue tip is placed. A little ways back from the lower teeth is a hollow area (or pit) in the lower surface of the mouth. When the tongue tip rests in this hollow area, there is an empty space below the tongue (a sublingual cavity), which results in a relatively duller sound. When the tip of the tongue rests against the lower teeth, there is no sublingual cavity, resulting in a sharper sound. Usually, the position of the tip of the tongue correlates with the grooved vs. hushing tongue shape so as to maximize the differences. However, the palato-alveolar sibilants in the Northwest Caucasian languages such as Ubykh are an exception. These sounds have the tongue tip resting directly against the lower teeth, which gives the sounds a quality that Catford describes as "hissing-hushing". See the article on postalveolar consonants for more information.

Symbols in the IPA 

The following table shows the types of sibilant fricatives defined in the International Phonetic Alphabet:

Diacritics can be used for finer detail.

Possible combinations 
The attested possibilities, with exemplar languages, are as follows. Note that the IPA diacritics are simplified; some articulations would require two diacritics to be fully specified, but only one is used in order to keep the results legible without the need for OpenType IPA fonts. Also, Ladefoged has resurrected an obsolete IPA symbol, the under dot, to indicate apical postalveolar (normally included in the category of retroflex consonants), and that notation is used here. (Note that the notation  is sometimes reversed; either may also be called 'retroflex' and written .)

  is an ad-hoc transcription. The old IPA letters  are also available.

 These sounds are usually just transcribed . Ladefoged resurrects the old retroflex sub-dot for apical retroflexes,  Also seen in the literature on e.g. Hindi and Norwegian is  – the domed articulation of  precludes a subapical realization.

Whistled sibilants 
Whistled sibilants occur phonemically in several southern Bantu languages, the best known being Shona. However, they also occur in speech pathology and may be caused by dental prostheses or orthodontics.

The whistled sibilants of Shona have been variously described—as labialized but not velarized, as retroflex, etc., but none of these features are required for the sounds.

Besides Shona, whistled sibilants have been reported as phonemes in Kalanga, Tsonga, Changana, Tshwa—all of which are Southern African languages—and Tabasaran. The articulation of whistled sibilants may differ between languages. In Shona, the lips are compressed throughout, and the sibilant may be followed by normal labialization upon release. (That is, there is a contrast among s, sw, ȿ, ȿw.) In Tsonga, the whistling effect is weak; the lips are narrowed but also the tongue is retroflex. Tswa may be similar. In Changana, the lips are rounded (protruded), but so in /s/ in the sequence /usu/, so there is evidently some distinct phonetic phenomenon occurring here that has yet to be formally identified and described.

Linguistic contrasts among sibilants 

Not including differences in manner of articulation or secondary articulation, some languages have as many as four different types of sibilants. For example, Northern Qiang and Southern Qiang have a four-way distinction among sibilant affricates , with one for each of the four tongue shapes.  Toda also has a four-way sibilant distinction, with one alveolar, one palato-alveolar, and two retroflex (apical postalveolar and subapical palatal). 

The now-extinct Ubykh language was particularly complex, with a total of 27 sibilant consonants. Not only all four tongue shapes were represented (with the palato-alveolar appearing in the laminal "closed" variation) but also both the palato-alveolars and alveolo-palatals could additionally appear labialized. Besides, there was a five-way manner distinction among voiceless and voiced fricatives, voiceless and voiced affricates, and  affricates. (The three labialized palato-alveolar affricates were missing, which is why the total was 27, not 30.)  The Bzyp dialect of the related Abkhaz language also has a similar inventory. 

Some languages have four types when palatalization is considered. Polish is one example, with both palatalized and non-palatalized laminal denti-alveolars, laminal postalveolar (or "flat retroflex"), and alveolo-palatal.  Russian has the same surface contrasts, but the alveolo-palatals are arguably not phonemic. They occur only geminate, and the retroflex consonants never occur geminate, which suggests that both are allophones of the same phoneme. 

Somewhat more common are languages with three sibilant types, including one hissing and two hushing. As with Polish and Russian, the two hushing types are usually postalveolar and alveolo-palatal since these are the two most distinct from each other. Mandarin Chinese is an example of such a language.  However, other possibilities exist. Serbo-Croatian has alveolar, flat postalveolar and alveolo-palatal affricates whereas Basque has palato-alveolar and laminal and apical alveolar (apico-alveolar) fricatives and affricates (late Medieval peninsular Spanish and Portuguese had the same distinctions among fricatives).

Many languages, such as English, have two sibilant types, one hissing and one hushing. A wide variety of languages across the world have this pattern. Perhaps most common is the pattern, as in English, with alveolar and palato-alveolar sibilants. Modern northern peninsular Spanish has a single apico-alveolar sibilant fricative , as well as a single palato-alveolar sibilant affricate . However, there are also languages with alveolar and apical retroflex sibilants (such as Standard Vietnamese) and with alveolar and alveolo-palatal postalveolars (e.g. alveolar and laminal palatalized  i.e.  in Catalan and Brazilian Portuguese, the latter probably through Amerindian influence, and alveolar and dorsal i.e.  proper in Japanese).<ref> Análise acústica de sequências de fricativas e africadas por japoneses aprendizes de português brasileiro, Universidade Federal do Paraná, page 1504</ref>

Only a few languages with sibilants lack the hissing type. Middle Vietnamese is normally reconstructed with two sibilant fricatives, both hushing (one retroflex, one alveolo-palatal). Some languages have only a single hushing sibilant and no hissing sibilant.

Languages with no sibilants are fairly rare. Most have no fricatives at all or only the fricative . Examples include most Australian languages, and Rotokas, and what is generally reconstructed for Proto-Bantu. Languages with fricatives but no sibilants, however, do occur, such as Ukue in Nigeria, which has only the fricatives . Also, almost all Eastern Polynesian languages have no sibilants but do have the fricatives  and/or : Māori, Hawaiian, Tahitian, Rapa Nui, most Cook Islands Māori dialects, Marquesan, and Tuamotuan.

Tamil only has the sibilant  and fricative  in loanwords, and they are frequently replaced by native sounds.

 Contested definitions 

However, they do not have the grooved articulation and high frequencies of other sibilants, and most phoneticians continue to group them together with bilabial ,  and (inter)dental ,  as non-sibilant anterior fricatives. Some researchers judge  to be non-strident in English, based on measurements of its comparative amplitude, but to be strident in other languages (for example, in the African language Ewe, where it contrasts with non-strident ).

The nature of sibilants as so-called 'obstacle fricatives' is complicated – there is a continuum of possibilities relating to the angle at which the jet of air may strike an obstacle. The grooving often considered necessary for classification as a sibilant has been observed in ultrasound studies of the tongue for the supposedly non-sibilant voiceless alveolar fricative  of English.

 See also 
 De-essing
 Plosive consonant
 Shibboleth
 Sj-sound
 Strident vowel
 Voiceless alveolar retracted sibilant
 Voiced apicoalveolar fricative

 Notes 

 References 
 
 
 
 
 
 Shosted, Ryan K. (2006) Just put your lips together and blow? The whistled fricatives of Southern Bantu.''

Manner of articulation